Brad Spencer (born c. 1981) is an American college football coach and former player. He is the head football coach at North Central College in Naperville, Illinois, a position he has held since 2022. In his first season, Spencer led the 2022 North Central Cardinals football team to the NCAA Division III Football Championship title.

Spencer attended Naperville Central High School, where he starred as a wide receiver. As a senior in 1999, he played on an undefeated Naperville Central team that won the Class 6A state championship. He played college football at North Central and graduated with program records for receptions, receiving yards, and receiving touchdowns. He joined the coaching staff at North Central in 2004 as wide receivers coach and was promoted to offensive coordinator in 2015.

Head coaching record

References

External links
 North Central profile

Year of birth missing (living people)
1980s births
Living people
American football wide receivers
North Central Cardinals football coaches
North Central Cardinals football players
Sportspeople from Naperville, Illinois
Coaches of American football from Illinois
Players of American football from Illinois